Colonel Theodore Godfrey Wijesinghe Jayewardene, VD, JP, CLI (June 17, 1872 – 1945; also known as T. G. Jayewardene) was a Ceylonese (Sri Lankan) engineer, politician and military officer. A member of the State Council of Ceylon, he was the first Ceylonese commanding officer of the Ceylon Light Infantry.

Early life and education
Born to James Alfred Jayewardene, a Proctor who was the Deputy Coroner of Colombo. His brothers were Hector Alfred Jayewardene, Justice Eugene Wilfred Jayewardene, KC and Justice John Adrian St. Valentine Jayewardene. Jayewardene was educated at the Royal College, Colombo.

Career
After becoming an engineer, he joined the Public Works Department in 1895 as an assistant engineer and in 1900 became a fully qualified Civil Engineer. He was elected to the State Council of Ceylon in 1933 from the Balangoda seat and held it till 1936.

Military service
He joined the Ceylon Light Infantry, a reservist regiment of the Ceylon Defence Force,  in 1889 as a private. However he was later commissioned and quickly climbed though the ranks becoming a major in 1908. In 1921 he was appointed as the intelligence officer of the Ceylon Defence Force. Promoted to lieutenant colonel, he served as the first Ceylonese commanding officer of the Ceylon Light Infantry from August 1919 to August 1923. He reached the rank of colonel, the highest rank a Ceylonese could achieve in the colonial era and was awarded the Volunteer Officers' Decoration.

Family
In 1905, he married Lena Attygalle, daughter of Mudaliyar Don Charles Gemoris Attygalle with whom he had a son Major Theodore Frederick, who was elected to the Parliament in 1948. His daughter Margie Jayewardene married A. F. Wijemanne, who was a senator and Minister of Justice (1965-1970). His brother-in-laws were Fredrick Richard Senanayake and John Kotelawala Sr. 

One of Colombo primary roads Colonel T. G. Jayewardene Mawatha has been named in his honor.

See also 
 List of political families in Sri Lanka

References

External links
  The JAYEWARDENE Ancestry

1872 births
1945 deaths
Sinhalese engineers
Ceylonese military personnel
Ceylon Light Infantry officers
Sri Lankan intelligence operatives
Alumni of Royal College, Colombo
Members of the 1st State Council of Ceylon
People from British Ceylon
Ceylonese military personnel of World War I
Sri Lankan justices of the peace
Theodore
Ceylonese colonels